Knight Street is a major north-south roadway in Vancouver and Richmond, British Columbia, Canada. It is a four-to-six lane freeway from Westminster Highway in Richmond to Marine Drive in Vancouver, thus serving as an alternate way to exit Vancouver southbound, rather than the Granville Street/Oak Street corridor. Upon entering Vancouver, Knight Street provides major access routes to East Vancouver; at 14th Avenue, the road turns into Clark Drive, and runs northbound until it reaches the Port of Vancouver at Burrard Inlet. It is the busiest truck route in Vancouver, and a key link between Vancouver and its neighbours to the south.

The freeway section of Knight Street crosses the Fraser River via the Knight Street Bridge, connecting Vancouver to Mitchell Island and Richmond. This is the only officially designated freeway in Metro Vancouver that is not also designated as a provincial highway. However, the whole length of Knight Street is part of TransLink's Major Road Network: the agency owns the Knight Street Bridge, and provides funding to the cities of Vancouver and Richmond for maintenance and major projects on the rest of the street.

The street has become a favourite for street racers in the Vancouver area probably because of its long straight bridge, though the police presence has recently improved to thwart this activity. The intersection of Knight Street and Southeast Marine Drive, at the northern end of Knight Street Bridge, ranked among the top ten motor-vehicle crash sites in all of British Columbia in 2008.

The Knight Street (formerly known as Knight Road) was named after Robert Knight, a property owner in South Vancouver in the late 19th and early 20th centuries. Clark Drive is named after Ephraim James Clark, a realtor who donated land to the city for a park in 1889.

Major intersections

References

External links

Clark-Knight Corridor Whole Route Analysis Project, City of Vancouver

Streets in Vancouver
Transport in Richmond, British Columbia
Freeways in British Columbia